Eupithecia oxycedrata is a moth in the family Geometridae. It is found in Spain, southern Portugal, the Balearic Islands, southern France, Corsica, Sardinia, Sicily, Malta, Italy, Slovenia, Croatia, Bosnia and Herzegovina, Montenegro, North Macedonia, Bulgaria, Greece, Crete, western Romania and the Crimea. It is also found in North Africa, from Morocco to Tunisia, and in Turkey. The habitat consists of dry maquis, especially where junipers grow.

The wingspan is 16-19.5 mm. There are two generations per year, with adults on wing from early April to late June and again from early September to mid October.

The larvae feed on the needles and flowers of Juniperus oxycedrus.

References

Moths described in 1833
oxycedrata
Moths of Europe
Moths of Asia
Moths of Africa
Taxa named by Jules Pierre Rambur